Javier Cienfuegos Pinilla (born 15 July 1990 in Montijo-Badajoz) is a Spanish hammer thrower and the junior world record holder. Javier represents his club CA Playas de Castellón, and is coached by Raul Jimeno. His personal best and junior world record with the 6 kg hammer, a throw of 82,96 m, was set in Madrid 17 June 2009. On 5 May 2012, he became the Spanish record holder with the senior weight hammer, which weighs 7,26 kg (16 lbs), after making a throw of 76,21 meters. He established a new national record of 78.70 m at the Estadi Olímpic Camilo Cano of La Nucia, on 31 August 2019.
On 6 September 2019, he improved this record with a mark of 79.38 m.

Sports career
Cienfuegos's first international championship was the 2007 World Youth Championships in Athletics (u18) held in Ostrava, Czech Republic. He was 17 years old at the time, and he finished 8th with a throw of 64,04 m with the 5 kg hammer – a relatively poor result, as his personal best, set four months earlier, was 73,20 m. Ukrainian Andriy Martynyuk emerged victorious with a throw of 76,09 m. Next year, his first year as a junior, he attended the 2008 World Junior Championships in Athletics (u20) in which he finished 12th in the final with a 65,93 m throw with the 6 kg hammer – also a relatively bad performance, his personal best at the time was 76,13 m, set three weeks earlier. Cienfuegos's nerves seemed to be the problem but the expectations only rose in 2009 when he beat Yevgeny Aydamirov's junior world record of 82,62 m and then set a new junior world record with his 82,96 m throw.  After more international competition experience, as well as three throws beyond 80 meters, he seemed to have learned how to cope with the pressure. He won the ninth annual European Cup Winter Throwing Championship (u23 group B) with a 73,18 m performance (hammer weight = 7,26 kg). He placed third (79,12 m) at the 2009 European Athletics Junior Championships behind youth World Champion from 2007, Ukrainian Andriy Martynyuk (79,54 m) and Hungarian Ákos Hudi (79,14 m) in one of history's toughest ever junior hammer competitions. Cienfuegos also attended the 2009 World Championships in Athletics and finished 13th in his qualifying group with a 72,01 performance (7,26 kg hammer).

Political career 
Cienfuegos ran 3rd in the People's Party (PP) list for Badajoz vis-à-vis the 2019 Extremaduran regional election, becoming a member of the 10th Assembly of Extremadura.

International honours

Progression

References

External links
 
 
 
 
 Interview with Spanish Athletics Federation 

1990 births
Living people
Spanish male hammer throwers
Olympic athletes of Spain
Athletes (track and field) at the 2012 Summer Olympics
Athletes (track and field) at the 2016 Summer Olympics
Athletes (track and field) at the 2020 Summer Olympics
World Athletics Championships athletes for Spain
Spanish Athletics Championships winners
People from Tierra de Mérida - Vegas Bajas
Sportspeople from the Province of Badajoz
Members of the 10th Assembly of Extremadura
Ibero-American Championships in Athletics winners